Gymnechinus, is a genus of sea urchin.

Species

 Gymnechinus abnormalis H.L. Clark, 1925
 Gymnechinus epistichus H.L. Clark, 1912
 Gymnechinus pulchellus Mortensen, 1904
 Gymnechinus robillardi (de Loriol, 1883)

References

Toxopneustidae